Aphnaeus chapini is a butterfly in the family Lycaenidae. It is found in Cameroon, the Republic of Congo, the Democratic Republic of Congo and Uganda.

Subspecies
Aphnaeus chapini chapini (Democratic Republic of Congo: Uele)
Aphnaeus chapini occidentalis Clench, 1963 (Cameroon, Congo)
Aphnaeus chapini ugandae Stempffer, 1961 (Uganda)

References

Butterflies described in 1920
Aphnaeus